The 2018 India Open, officially the Yonex-Sunrise Dr. Akhilesh Das Gupta India Open 2018, was a badminton tournament which took place at Siri Fort Indoor Stadium in India from 30 January to 4 February 2018 and had a total purse of $350,000.

Tournament
The 2018 India Open was the fourth tournament of the 2018 BWF World Tour and also part of the India Open championships which has been held since 2008. This tournament was organized by the Badminton Association of India and sanctioned by the BWF. The tournament was renamed in a tribute for Akhilesh Das, president of the Badminton Association of India, who died in April 2017.

Venue
This international tournament was held at Siri Fort Indoor Stadium in New Delhi, India.

Point distribution
Below is a table with the point distribution for each phase of the tournament based on the BWF points system for the BWF World Tour Super 500 event.

Prize money
The total prize money for the 2018 tournament was US$350,000. Distribution of prize money was in accordance with BWF regulations.

Men's singles

Seeds

 Viktor Axelsen (withdrew)
 Srikanth Kidambi (second round)
 Chou Tien-chen (final)
 Shi Yuqi (champion)
 Prannoy H. S. (first round)
 Wang Tzu-wei (quarterfinals)
 Anders Antonsen (first round)
 B. Sai Praneeth (quarterfinals)

Finals

Top half

Section 1

Section 2

Bottom half

Section 3

Section 4

Women's singles

Seeds

 P. V. Sindhu (final)
 Carolina Marín (quarterfinals)
 Ratchanok Intanon (semifinals)
 Saina Nehwal (quarterfinals)
 Zhang Beiwen (champion)
 Cheung Ngan Yi (semifinals)
 Yip Pui Yin (quarterfinals)
 Beatriz Corrales (quarterfinals)

Finals

Top half

Section 1

Section 2

Bottom half

Section 3

Section 4

Men's doubles

Seeds

 Marcus Fernaldi Gideon / Kevin Sanjaya Sukamuljo (champions)
 Mathias Boe / Carsten Mogensen (second round)
 Lu Ching-yao / Yang Po-han (second round)
 Kim Astrup / Anders Skaarup Rasmussen (final)
 Mathias Christiansen / David Daugaard (first round)
 Ong Yew Sin / Teo Ee Yi (withdrew)
 Angga Pratama / Rian Agung Saputro (quarterfinals)
 He Jiting / Tan Qiang (quarterfinals)

Finals

Top half

Section 1

Section 2

Bottom half

Section 3

Section 4

Women's doubles

Seeds

 Kamilla Rytter Juhl / Christinna Pedersen (semifinals)
 Jongkolphan Kititharakul / Rawinda Prajongjai  (final)
 Greysia Polii / Apriyani Rahayu (champions)
 Chayanit Chaladchalam / Phataimas Muenwong (second round)
 Della Destiara Haris / Rizki Amelia Pradipta (quarterfinals)
 Ashwini Ponnappa / N. Sikki Reddy (quarterfinals)
 Meghana Jakkampudi / Poorvisha S Ram (quarterfinals)
 Kittipak Dubthuk / Natcha Saengchote (quarterfinals)

Finals

Top half

Section 1

Section 2

Bottom half

Section 3

Section 4

Mixed doubles

Seeds

 Tontowi Ahmad / Liliyana Natsir (withdrew)
 Chris Adcock / Gabrielle Adcock (withdrew)
 Tan Kian Meng / Lai Pei Jing (second round)
 Goh Soon Huat / Shevon Jemie Lai (quarterfinals)
 Mathias Christiansen / Christina Pedersen (champions)
 He Jiting / Du Yue (semifinals)
 Chan Peng Soon / Goh Liu Ying (first round)
 Pranaav Jerry Chopra / N. Sikki Reddy (semifinals)

Finals

Top half

Section 1

Section 2

Bottom half

Section 3

Section 4

References

External links
 Tournament Link

India Open (badminton)
India Open
Open (badminton)
India Open (badminton)
India Open (badminton)